Salacca affinis, also known as red salak, red snakefruit salak, red snakefruit, buah ridan salak, buah ridan, linsum, salak hutan, buah manau, kelubi, buah rotan, and ridan, is a flowering shrub in the family Arecaceae. The specific epithet (affinis) comes from Latin "ad finis", meaning "at the boundary", and refers to its resemblance with the congener species Salacca zalacca.

Distribution
Salacca affinis is native to Singapore, Peninsular Malaysia, Borneo, Java, and Sumatra, and occurs in the understory of rainforests, especially near ponds and swamps.

Description
It is a dioecious, acaulescent, and cespitose plant, and forms large, spiny tufts. The petioles measure up to 1 meter in length and are covered in yellow-orange to brown spines, which measure up to 10 centimeters in length and occur in clusters of 2–4. They are lanceolate in shape and drooping. The rachis are covered in irregularly arranged spines, similar to the petioles. The topmost leaves have toothed, almost torn tips. The inflorescences are axillary and are subtended by leafy bracts. The male inflorescences measure  in length and are ramified and have elongated and flattened spines bearing male flowers on cylindrical rachillae shaped like an ear. The single flower measures  in length. They are red when ripe and have smooth scales, hence the name "snakefruit". It normally contains up to 3 pale yellow to white seeds and takes form at the center of the plant, making them hard to reach due to the abundance of spines. It is edible and has a sour although slightly sweet flavor, somewhat similar to asam paya. It grows well in well-drained, slightly acidic, or neutral soils rich in organic substance.

Uses
Salacca affinis is rarely cultivated outside of its native range. Since their spines discourage its cultivation in parks and gardens, it is rarely found in cultivation outside of botanical gardens. Cultivation for fruit is limited as those of Salacca zalacca are superior, although it is sometimes gathered locally and sold in markets.

Conservation status
Salacca affinis is not evaluated by the IUCN. In 2011 it was rediscovered in Singapore in the Nee Soon Swamp Forest, where it was thought to be extinct.

See also
List of culinary fruits

References

affinis
Flora of Malaya
Flora of Sumatra
Flora of Borneo
Fruit trees
Taxa named by William Griffith
Plants described in 1845